The Australian Department of Agriculture, Water and the Environment (DAWE) was an Australian Government department which operated from 1 February 2020 until 30 June 2022. It represented Australia's national interests in agriculture, water and the environment.

On 1 July 2022, the agriculture and water component became the Department of Agriculture, Fisheries and Forestry (DAFF), while the environment component became the new Department of Climate Change, Energy, the Environment and Water.

Organisation, key people, functions 

The Department represents Australia's national interests across agriculture, water and the environment.

The Secretary of the Department of Agriculture, Water and Environment, Andrew Metcalfe , is responsible to the Minister for Agriculture, Drought and Emergency Management, Murray Watt.

It is sometimes referred to by the acronym DAWE.

Functions 
The department is responsible for the Commonwealth's regulation and oversight of:

 Agricultural, pastoral, fishing, food and forest industries
 Soils and other natural resources
 Rural adjustment and drought issues
 Rural industries inspection and quarantine
 Primary industries research including economic research
 Commodity marketing, including export promotion and agribusiness
 Commodity-specific international organisations and activities
 Administration of international commodity agreements
 Administration of export controls on agricultural, fisheries and forestry industries products
 Food security policy and programmes
 Water policy and resources
 Biosecurity, in relation to animals and plants
 Environment protection and conservation of biodiversity 
 Air quality
 National fuel quality standards
 Land contamination
 Meteorology
 Administration of the Australian Antarctic Territory, and the Territory of Heard Island and McDonald Islands 
 Natural, built and cultural heritage
 Environmental information and research
 Ionospheric prediction
 Co-ordination of sustainable communities policy
 Urban environment
 Environmental water use and resources relating to the Commonwealth Environmental Water Holder

It is also responsible for maintaining the Australian Heritage Database.

Food safety and biosecurity

The department is responsible for food safety in Australia. It works with industry and other Australian government agencies, in particular the Department of Health and Food Standards Australia New Zealand (FSANZ) to develop policy and food standards. Food standards are developed under the Australia New Zealand Food Standards Code, administered by FSANZ and enforced by state and territory governments.

Together with the Department of Health, the Department administers biosecurity in Australia. The department administers relevant legislation at the Australian border, and imported food must meet Australia's biosecurity requirements (under the Biosecurity Act 2015), as well as food safety requirements of the Imported Food Control Act 1992. Labelling on imported food must comply the requirements, and is regulated under the Imported Food Inspection Scheme.

Portfolio agencies 
Agencies that exist within the department include:

 Bureau of Meteorology 
 Director of National Parks
Murray-Darling Basin Authority
 Great Barrier Reef Marine Park Authority
 Sydney Harbour Federation Trust
Australian Antarctic Division
Australian Bureau of Agricultural and Resource Economics and Sciences
Australian Fisheries Management Authority
Australian Pesticides & Veterinary Medicines Authority
Australia's Nature Hub
National Landcare Program
National Pollutant Inventory
Physical Environment Analysis Network
Sustainable Development Goals
Forest and Wood Products Council
Regional Investment Corporation
National Environmental Protection Council

History

Preceding departments – Agriculture
Department of Markets and Migration (16 January 1925 – 19 January 1928)
Department of Markets (19 January 1928 – 10 December 1928)
Department of Markets and Transport (10 December 1928 – 21 April 1930)
Department of Markets (21 April 1930 – 13 April 1932)
Department of Commerce (13 April 1932 – 22 December 1942)
Department of Commerce and Agriculture (22 December 1942 – 11 January 1956)
Department of Primary Industry (11 January 1956 – 2 June 1974)
Department of Agriculture (12 June 1974 – 22 December 1975)
Department of Primary Industry (22 December 1975 – 24 July 1987)
Department of Primary Industries and Energy (24 July 1987 – 21 October 1998)
Department of Agriculture, Fisheries and Forestry (21 October 1998 – 18 September 2013)
Department of Agriculture (18 September 2013 – 21 September 2015)
Department of Agriculture and Water Resources (21 September 2015 – 29 May 2019)
Department of Agriculture (29 May 2019 – 1 February 2020)

Preceding departments – Environment
Department of the Environment and Energy (19 July 2016 – 1 February 2020)

Formation
The department was formed by way of an administrative order issued on 5 December 2019 and effective from 1 February 2020. The new department took over all functions of the previous Department of Agriculture, and the environment functions of the previous Department of the Environment and Energy.

See also

 Australian Bureau of Agricultural and Resource Economics
 Australian Fisheries Management Authority
 Director of National Parks (includes Parks Australia)
 List of Australian Commonwealth Government entities
 Minister for Agriculture and Water Resources
 Murray-Darling Basin Authority

References

External links
 Department of Agriculture, Water and the Environment

Agriculture, Water and the Environment
Agricultural organisations based in Australia
Australia
Fishing in Australia
Agriculture ministries
Australia
2020 establishments in Australia
Ministries established in 2020
Environment of Australia
Energy in Australia
Department of Agriculture, Fisheries and Forestry